Murthy/Murthi/Murty is a surname from the Indian states of Tamil Nadu, Andhra Pradesh, Karnataka, and Telangana. It is found commonly amongst Brahmins as a personal name or surname.

Notable people

Notable people with the surname Murthy include:

 Bayya Suryanarayana Murthy (1906–1979), Parliamentarian and leader of Dalit movement in India
 Dipika Murthy (born 1980), Indian hockey player
 H. R. Keshava Murthy, Indian Gamaka exponent
 H. S. Venkateshamurthy (born 1944), poet, playwright in Kannada Language.
 Karanam Balaram Krishna Murthy (born 1946), Indian politician
 Krishnan Guru-Murthy (born 1970), British television presenter and journalist
 M. Chidananda Murthy (1931–2020), Indian scholar
 M. R. N. Murthy, Indian scientist and academic
 M. Rajasekara Murthy (1922–2010), Indian politician
 Mahesh Murthy (born 1965), founder of Pinstorm
 Mano Murthy, Indian musician and composer
 N. R. Narayana Murthy (born 1946), founder of Infosys
 R. Narayana Murthy (born 1954), Indian film director and producer of Telugu films
 Rohan Murthy, son of N. R. Narayana Murthy and co-founder of Infosys
 Sheela Murthy (born 1961), lawyer and philanthropist
 Srinivasa Murthy (born 1949), Indian actor
 Sudha Murthy (born 1950), Indian social reformer and writer
 T. K. Murthy (born 1922), Indian Mridangam player
 Tammareddy Krishna Murthy (1920–2013), Telugu film producer from India
 Tummala Seetharama Murthy (1901–1990), Indian Telugu poet
 U. R. Ananthamurthy (1932–2014), contemporary writer and critic in the Kannada language
 V. K. Murthy (1923–2014), Indian cinematographer
 Veda Krishna Murthy (born 1992), Indian cricketer
 Veturi Sundararama Murthy (1936–2010), Indian Telugu poet
 Vivek Murthy (born 1977), American Physician
 Karthikeya Murthy (born 1985), Indian Music Composer

References

Indian surnames
Karnataka society
Telugu names